The 1978 California lieutenant gubernatorial election was held on November 7, 1978. Republican nominee Mike Curb defeated Democratic incumbent Mervyn Dymally with 51.64% of the vote. , this was the last time a Republican was elected Lieutenant Governor of California.

Primary elections
Primary elections were held on June 6, 1978.

Democratic primary

Candidates
Mervyn Dymally, incumbent Lieutenant Governor
Patricia E. "Penny" Raven
Patrick Matthew Fitzpatrick
Abe Tapia

Results

Republican primary

Candidates
Mike Curb, musician
Michael D. Antonovich, State Assemblyman

Results

General election

Candidates
Major party candidates
Mike Curb, Republican
Mervyn Dymally, Democratic 

Other candidates
Houston Myers, American Independent 
Jan B. Tucker, Peace and Freedom

Results

References

California
1978
Lieutenant